Ali Salajegheh (born 1967 in Rabor, Iran), is the Vice President of Iran and Head of Iran's Department of Environment in the 13th government. He was previously Deputy Minister of Agriculture and Head of the Forests and Rangelands Organization of Iran.

He has a PhD from the University of Tehran and did his post-doctoral studies in water footprint accounting under the supervision of Professor Kaveh Madani.

References 

1967 births
Heads of Department of Environment (Iran)
People from Kerman Province
Living people
Academic staff of the University of Tehran
Vice presidents